And Soon the Darkness may refer to:
 And Soon the Darkness (1970 film), a British thriller film
 And Soon the Darkness (2010 film), an American-Argentine mystery thriller film